Ololygon cardosoi is a species of frog in the family Hylidae. The specific name cardosoi honors Adão José Cardoso, a Brazilian herpetologist.

It is endemic to Brazil.
Its natural habitats are subtropical or tropical moist lowland forests, subtropical or tropical moist montane forests, and rivers.
It is threatened by habitat loss.

References

cardosoi
Endemic fauna of Brazil
Amphibians of Brazil
Amphibians described in 1991
Taxonomy articles created by Polbot
Taxobox binomials not recognized by IUCN